Like Once Lili Marleen (German: ...wie einst Lili Marleen) is a 1956 West German romantic drama film directed by Paul Verhoeven and starring Adrian Hoven, Marianne Hold and Claus Holm. The title refers to the popular wartime song "Lili Marleen" popularised by Lale Anderson, who performs it at a concert at the end of the film.

It was shot at the Spandau Studios in West Berlin. The film's sets were designed by the art directors Albrecht Hennings and Karl Weber.

Synopsis
Violinmaker Franz Brugger is in love with Christa. When he is conscripted during the Second World War she promises to wait for him. He fights on the Eastern Front for four years and then is held as a prisoner of war by the Soviets for a further ten. All along he is kept going by the song "Lili Marlene" and the thought of Christa. When at last he is released he returns home to  Berlin and finds the world significantly changed from that which he remembers. Worse, Christa is engaged to be married to another man. He sets out to win her back.

Cast
 Adrian Hoven as Franz Brugger
 Marianne Hold as 	Christa Schmidt
 Claus Holm as	Oberarzt Dr. Robert Berger
 Hannelore Schroth as 	Klärchen Müller
 Peter Carsten as 	Toni Knoll
 Käthe Haack as Frau Schmidt
 Wolfgang Preiss a 	Alfred Linder
 Lucie Englisch as 	Minna Lauck
 Roma Bahn as Fräulein Korn
 Kurt Vespermann as 	Portier Krause
 Gudrun Schmidt as Schwester, Lene
 Ralf Wolter as Deutscher Soldat
 Hildegard Grethe as 	Frau Berger
 Else Ehser as 	Aufwartefrau
 Lale Andersen as 	Singer 'Lili Marleen' - 'Südseenacht'

References

Bibliography
 Lehrke, Gisela. Wie einst Lili Marleen: das Leben der Lale Andersen. Henschel, 2002.

External links 
 

1956 films
1956 drama films
1956 musical films
German musical films
German romantic drama films
West German films
1950s German-language films
Films directed by Paul Verhoeven (Germany)
Constantin Film films
Films shot at Spandau Studios
Films set in Berlin
German World War II films
1950s German films
German black-and-white films